Joseph Louis Martin St. Pierre (born 11 August 1983) is a Canadian-Kazakhstani former professional ice hockey forward who last played for Dunaújvárosi Acélbikák in the Erste Liga. St. Pierre was previously most recently with HC Slovan Bratislava of the Slovak Tipsport Liga.

Playing career
As a youth, St. Pierre played in the 1997 Quebec International Pee-Wee Hockey Tournament with a minor ice hockey team from Hawkesbury, Ontario.

Undrafted, St. Pierre was a graduate of the Guelph Storm of the Ontario Hockey League, where he won the Wayne Gretzky Trophy in 2004. St. Pierre then played his first professional season in 2004–05 with the Greenville Grrrowl of the ECHL and the Edmonton Roadrunners of the AHL.

On 3 November 2005, Martin was signed as a free agent by the Chicago Blackhawks and was assigned to the Norfolk Admirals of the AHL. He made his NHL debut with the Blackhawks in the 2005–06 season. St. Pierre spent the majority of the next two seasons in the AHL with the Admirals and the Rockford IceHogs. He also had a brief spell in the Russian Super League prior to the 2007–08 season with Khimik Mytishchi.

After appearing in only 21 games with the Blackhawks through parts of 3 seasons, St. Pierre was traded to the Boston Bruins for Pascal Pelletier on 24 July 2008. St. Pierre was then assigned to the Bruins affiliate, the Providence Bruins. On 20 December 2008, Martin received his first call-up to the Bruins. He played his first game for Boston, recording an assist, in a 6-3 win over the St. Louis Blues on 21 December 2008. On 30 December 2008 St. Pierre scored his first Bruins goal, in a 5-2 Bruins road win over the Pittsburgh Penguins as a shorthanded goal.

On 1 July 2009, St. Pierre signed a one-year contract with the Ottawa Senators. He was assigned to the Binghamton Senators. He was called up to Ottawa and played his first game for Ottawa against the Florida Panthers on 9 January 2010.

On 6 June 2010, St. Pierre left the NHL for Europe signing a one-year contract with Russian team, HC Neftekhimik Nizhnekamsk, of the KHL.

On 11 July 2011, St. Pierre signed a one-year contract with the Blue Jackets  He was assigned to the Blue Jackets' AHL affiliate, the Springfield Falcons, where he would spend the remainder of the season, playing in 73 games and leading the team in points, recording 11 goals and 53 assists.<ref></ref</ref> On 2 July 2012, St. Pierre signed a contract to return with the Blackhawks AHL affiliate, the Rockford IceHogs.

On 6 July 2013, St. Pierre signed a one-year two-way deal as a free agent with the Montreal Canadiens. In the 2013-14 season, St. Pierre was originally assigned to the Canadiens AHL affiliate, the Hamilton Bulldogs. He remained with the Bulldogs for the majority of the year, playing in a solitary game with the Canadiens in his one recall to the NHL.

On 24 July 2014, St. Pierre returned to Europe, agreeing to a one-year deal with Croatian club,  KHL Medveščak Zagreb, of the KHL. He finished the season at Lausanne HC.

On 9 August 2015, St. Pierre signed a contract with KHL club Barys Astana of Kazakhstan. He later accepted naturalised citizenship with Kazakhstan and represented the country at the 2017 IIHF Division I World Championships.

In his third and final season under contract with Astana in 2017–18, St. Pierre was traded by the club to Russian outfit, Admiral Vladivostok in exchange for James Wright on 24 November 2017.

In July 2019, St. Pierre signed with the Sheffield Steelers of the British Elite Ice Hockey League, however he was released by the club just two months later.

After spells in 2019-20 with DVTK Jegesmedvék and HC Slovan Bratislava, St. Pierre moved to Hungary for the 2020-21 season to sign with Dunaújvárosi Acélbikák.

On March 16, 2021, St. Pierre announced his retirement from hockey.

Career statistics

Regular season and playoffs

International

Awards and honours

References

External links

, or ESPN.com

1983 births
Living people
Admiral Vladivostok players
Atlant Moscow Oblast players
Barys Nur-Sultan players
Binghamton Senators players
Boston Bruins players
Canadian ice hockey centres
Chicago Blackhawks players
EC Red Bull Salzburg players
Edmonton Road Runners players
Greenville Grrrowl players
Guelph Storm players
Hamilton Bulldogs (AHL) players
Ice hockey people from Ontario
Kazakhstani ice hockey players
KHL Medveščak Zagreb players
HC Kunlun Red Star players
HC Slovan Bratislava players
Lausanne HC players
Montreal Canadiens players
HC Neftekhimik Nizhnekamsk players
Norfolk Admirals players
Ottawa Senators players
Oulun Kärpät players
People from Russell, Ontario
Providence Bruins players
Rockford IceHogs (AHL) players
Springfield Falcons players
Sheffield Steelers players
DVTK Jegesmedvék players
Dunaújvárosi Acélbikák players
Undrafted National Hockey League players
Canadian expatriate ice hockey players in Austria
Canadian expatriate ice hockey players in Croatia
Canadian expatriate ice hockey players in China
Canadian expatriate ice hockey players in Finland
Canadian expatriate ice hockey players in Russia
Canadian expatriate ice hockey players in Switzerland
Canadian expatriate ice hockey players in the United States
Canadian expatriate ice hockey players in Kazakhstan
Canadian expatriate ice hockey players in England
Canadian expatriate ice hockey players in Hungary
Naturalised citizens of Kazakhstan
Kazakhstani expatriate ice hockey people
Kazakhstani expatriate sportspeople in Russia
Kazakhstani expatriate sportspeople in China
Kazakhstani expatriate sportspeople in England
Kazakhstani expatriate sportspeople in Hungary
Kazakhstani expatriate sportspeople in Slovakia